Bullet Train To Vegas was a Southern California-based rock band. The band put out their debut EP Profile This in 2003, then a self-titled two-song 7" in 2004.  They signed with Nitro Records the following year and released their debut full-length, We Put Scissors Where Our Mouths Are, in 2005.  They named themselves after a song by Drive Like Jehu, and have been compared to At The Drive In, Fugazi, Pretty Girls Make Graves and Sparta. They broke up shortly after recording their second full length album The City and None of the Above.

Members

Dan Sena - Vocals, Guitar (2001-2007)
Marty Cornish - Drums (2003-2007)
Greg Horton - Bass, Vocals (2004-2007)
Erik Bailey - Guitar (2004-2007)

Past Members

Thomas Coatney - Guitar (2001-2002)
John Kelley - Drums (2001-2002)
Steve Hutchison - Bass (2001-2002)
Jeb Sprague - Guitar (2003-2004)
Toby Sterrett - Bass (2003-2004)
Jarrod Alexander - Drums (2001, demo)

Discography

Album
We Put Scissors Where Our Mouths Are (Nitro, 2005)
The City and None of the Above (Unreleased, 2007)

Singles & EPs
Boob Eaters Demo (Self-released, 2001)
Profile This EP (Letterbomb, 2003)
Bullet Train To Vegas 7" (Can't Never Could, 2004)

External links
Official page
Nitro Records

Indie rock musical groups from California